Azolla rubra, known commonly as red azolla and Pacific azolla, is a species of aquatic fern native to Australia and New Zealand.

Distribution 
Azolla rubra is found in Australia and New Zealand. Its range is thought to extend to Papua New Guinea, Indonesia and Japan.

In New Zealand, it is found on the North and South Islands, and on Raoul Island in the Kermadecs.

Habitat 
Forms extensive red mats on slow moving bodies of water such as streams, lakes, ponds and swamps. May also occur on man-made water bodies such as farm ponds, drains, ditches, dams and cattle troughs.

References 

Salviniales